Pankaj Joshi (born 25 April 1953) is an Indian physicist and cosmologist whose research is mainly focused on areas of gravitational collapse and naked singularities. He has published over 200 papers in national and international journals. Joshi currently holds the position of provost at Charotar University of Science and Technology.

Early life and career 
Pankaj S. Joshi was born in Bhavnagar, Gujarat on 25 April 1953.

He earned his B.Sc. degree from Sir P.P. Institute of Science, Maharaja Krishnakumarinhji Bhavnagar University. He then moved to Rajkot to pursue M.Sc. from department of mathematics, Saurashtra University. Continuing at Saurashtra university Joshi obtained his Ph.D. degree in 1979 defending his thesis titled 'A study of causality in general relativity'.

After his doctoral work, he joined Tata Institute of Fundamental Research in Mumbai as visiting fellow. He held several positions at TIFR, Mumbai from 1979 to 2018. He was senior professor at department of astronomy and astrophysics, TIFR before joining Charotar University of Science and Technology as provost and founding director for the International Centre for Cosmology.

Joshi served as president at Indian Association of General Relativity and Gravitation from 2010 to 2012. He currently holds position of president at Gujarat Science Academy.

Awards and honours 

 Elected fellow of The World Academy of Sciences(TWAS), 2021
 INSA Vainu Bappu award, 2020
 Elected fellow of Indian National Sciene Academy(INSA), 2013
 Elected fellow of National Academy of Sciences India(NASI), 2006
 Gravity Research Foundation (USA) award for research on the Final Fate of Gravitational Collapse, 1991
 Prof. A. C. Banerji Gold Medal and Memorial Lecture award by the National Academy of Sciences (NASI)
 C V Raman lecture award by the Department of Atomic Energy (DAE)

Books 

 વિજ્ઞાન- ગોષ્ટી, 2011
 બ્રહ્માંડ- દર્શન, 2008 (4th Edition, 2011)
 તારા સૃષ્ટિ, 2006 (3rd Edition, 2010)
 ખગોળ  ના  મહાપ્રશ્નો, 2004
 સાપેક્ષવાદ, 2002
 તારા સર્જન અને વિલય, 2000
 કુતૂહુલ (Gujarati translation), part I and II, it teenagers series; 1982, 1984
 પ્રયોગો ની મઝા, 1985
 અવનવા પ્રયોગો, 1986
 Popular Articles on Science and Cosmology (During the period 1981-2022)

References 

21st-century Indian physicists
Indian cosmologists
1953 births
Living people
Fellows of the Indian National Science Academy
Fellows of The National Academy of Sciences, India
TWAS fellows
Scientists from Gujarat
People from Bhavnagar
20th-century Indian physicists
Indian academic administrators